The 1993 European Youth Olympic Winter Days was the inaugural edition of multi-sport event for European youths between the ages of 13 and 18 in winter sports. It was held in Aosta, Italy, between 7 and 10 February 1993.

Sports

Medalists

Alpine skiing

Biathlon

Cross-country skiing

Figure skating

Short track speed skating

Medal table

External links
 Results

European Youth Olympic Winter Festival
European Youth Olympic Winter Festival
European Youth Olympic Winter Festival
European Youth Olympic Winter Festival
International sports competitions hosted by Italy
Youth sport in Italy
Sports festivals in Italy
1993 in youth sport
January 1993 sports events in Europe
Aosta